Josef Seyfried (7 October 1895 – 19 December 1956) was a Czech equestrian. He competed at the 1928 Summer Olympics and the 1936 Summer Olympics.

References

1895 births
1956 deaths
Czech male equestrians
Olympic equestrians of Czechoslovakia
Equestrians at the 1928 Summer Olympics
Equestrians at the 1936 Summer Olympics
Sportspeople from Prague